German Quiles (born May 9, 1939) is a former Democratic member of the Pennsylvania House of Representatives.

References

1939 births
Living people
Hispanic and Latino American state legislators in Pennsylvania
People from Añasco, Puerto Rico
American politicians of Puerto Rican descent
Democratic Party members of the Pennsylvania House of Representatives